Ali Fawzi (born March 17, 1992) is an Egyptian professional footballer who plays as a right-back for the Egyptian club Enppi. In 2016, he signed a 3-year contract for the first-tier club Ennpi, to complete his transfer from Aluminum for £E700,000.

References

External links

1992 births
Living people
Al Aluminium SC players
ENPPI SC players
Egyptian footballers
Association football defenders
Place of birth missing (living people)
Egyptian Premier League players